Haliurunas, haljarunae, Haliurunnas, haliurunnae, etc., were Gothic "witches" (also called priestesses, seeresses, shamans or wise women) who appear once in Getica, a 6th century work on Gothic history. The account tells that the early Goth king Filimer found witches among his people when they had settled north of the Black Sea, and that he banished them to exile. They were impregnated by unclean spirits and engendered the Huns, and the account is a precursor of later Christian traditions where wise women were alleged to have sexual intercourse and even orgies with demons and the Devil.

The term has cognates, or close cognates, in both Old English and Old High German, which shows that it had an old history in Gothic culture and paganism and originates in Proto-Germanic. The account may be based on a historic event c. 200 AD, when the Goths had won a critical and decisive victory and a new royal clan asserted its power, and the priestesses were banished for opposing the new royal ancestor cult. In connection to this, they may also have been banished by their king in order to take over their riches. Another reason may have been blaming them as scapegoats for having caused a defeat against enemies by predicting the wrong outcome.

Etymology

The first element - is a variant of - 'Hell' (i.e. 'Hel, the abode of the dead'), but it has also been suggested that the first element does not refer to the realm of the dead, but instead directly to Hel, the goddess of the dead.

Orel follows this interpretation and reconstructs it as the Proto-Germanic form * in which the first element is * 'hel, the abode of the dead', and the second is * ('mystery, secret'). 

During Proto-Germanic times, the word * still referred to chanting and not to letters (rune), and in the sense 'incantation' it was probably borrowed from Proto-Germanic into Finnish where  means 'poem'.

Neidorf adds that the use of the word in Beowulf supports the early 8th century dating of the poem, because besides the unambiguous attestation in the 6th century Getica, it is only attested in the 8th century Aldhelmian glosses, where it appears five times.

Lukman (1949) argued that Cassiodorus was inspired by a Roman account about a Germanic seeress whose name appeared in the form , but the word  is generally considered to be an authentic Gothic word.

Account

Sixth century Goth scholar Jordanes reported in his Getica that the early Goths had called their seeresses  (Goth-Latin).  They were in the words of Wolfram "women who engaged in magic with the world of the dead", and they were banished from their tribe by Filimer who was the last pre-Amal dynasty king of the migrating Goths.

The  found refuge in the wilderness where they were impregnated by unclean spirits from the Steppe, and engendered the Huns, which Pohl compares with the origin of the Sarmatians as presented by Herodotus. The account serves as an explanation for the origins of the Huns.

Historical background

Suggesting that the account is not authentic, Goffart has proposed the following conversation between Cassiodorus, making up stories, and his Goth  adjutant:

Pohl is critical towards Goffart's approach and writes that he has "led an insistent campaign against all sorts of oral traditions and pagan lore" and comments that the discipline of cultural anthropology shows that most peoples have traditions of their distant past, although not exactly as they happened. In most countries in the world, even in Boston, Massachusetts and in Vienna, people do indeed have oral traditions that go back several centuries to attested historical events, such as the American Revolution and the Battle of Vienna (1683). Pohl adds that it is commonly assumed in contemporary mediaeval studies that such stories contribute to the shaping of ethnic identities, and he dates the Halirunnae legend to post-375 (see the Christianization of the Goths).

Wolfram considers that historically the banishment would have happened in the 2nd century, but it was repeatedly retold and renewed for four centuries until it was written down in the 6th century. He also preserved other Gotic pre-Amal dynasty and pre-ethnographic information, some of which was also preserved in the Scandinavian eddic heroic poem Hamðismál.

Cultic and dynastic shift
A pagan society banished people who had used sorcery to violate norms, and so the women performed rites that were either not yet accepted or had ceased being so. It is possible that the migrating Goths encountered new shamanistic rites when they reached the Black Sea c. 200 AD, but it is also possible that the Gothic elite decided to enforce a change in cult. 

Wolfram (2006) compares the account with the Lombard legend of Gambara of the Vinnili (early Lombards) which begins in a Vanir context, where two brothers are directed by a wise and divinely inspired woman. She is a priestess who invokes and receives help from the Vanir goddess Fre(yi)a, when her tribe is threatened by the more numerous Vandals. He comments that Fre(yi)a is portrayed as the wife of Godan (Odin), and this role normally belongs to the Aesir goddess Frigg, but he considers correct the view that she and several other goddess are versions of Freyja. Both the Vinnili and the Vandals were ready to transform themselves into more successful model of a migrating army, and consequently to reject their old Vanir (fertility) cult and embrace Odin as their leader. It is the women that sacrifice their past and their traditional cult in order to save their tribe under the leadership of their priestess Gambara and their goddess Freyja. They pave the way for their men's victory and they legitimize the transformation into a new tribe, the Lombards. 

He argues that Gambara's Gothic counterparts may have instead represented the conservative faction and resisted change. As in the case of the early Lombards, this would have taken place after a decisive victory that saved a tribe whose existence had been threatened by enemies. Odin was still a new god, and the Goths worshiped instead the "old" god Gaut who was made the Scandinavian great-grandfather of Amal, the founder of the new ruling clan. The same decision was made by the royal family of Essex who had  (Gaut) precede  (Odin) as their ancestor. Also, the royal Yngling dynasty of Sweden claimed descendance from the god Yngvi-Freyr and the Swedish kings were his incarnations, and this was also the case of Gaut's descendants, the Amal clan.

Royal greed
In addition to cultic tensions surrounding the royal descent from the gods, the decision may also have been based on ambition and greed. Germanic seeresses received gifts for their services and the Gothic ones may have grown too rich and powerful. Their sanctuaries were probably prosperous, and it may have been too tempting to confiscate their riches which happened to the Oracle at Delphi in Greece. In Scandinavia much later, the Swedish king Gustav Wasa converted his country to Lutheranism and took over the properties of the Catholic Church, and in France king Philip V of France confiscated the riches of the Knights Templar.

Failed prophesying
Enright (1996) comments that the seeresses served the wishes and the interest of a Germanic warlord, like Filimer, by divination and the casting of lots, which is in fact a propaganda tool that is very sophisticated. A Germanic warlord could not depend on the troops' discipline like the Roman commanders, but as in the case of Ariovistus their troops could consist of bands men from six or seven tribes, who were not bound by a common tribal loyalty. Instead the firmness of purpose and morale of the Germanic armies depended on the warlord's reputation for success, cleverness and personal bravery. Even if the warriors' women were not present, the warlord could not retreat, without destroying his reputation and having his army abandon him. It was only the seeresses and their divination that gave him someone to blame for failure. When the warlord was successful, he reaped the glory, but when he failed, the seeresses could be blamed. This could very well have been the reason why Filimer banished his seeresses.

Christian influence
Maenchen-Helfen (1944) has argued that the account comes from a Christian tradition, but Wolfram (2006) answers that the word  is Gothic, and is derived neither from Christian nor Jewish texts, and it can have been invented by neither Cassiodorus nor Jordanes, but it was disguised in a Christian form. Wagner argues that the demonization of both the women and the Huns shows that the account was written in a Christian context. Morris (1991) comments that it was a precedent for future Christian tradition, where demonic women have intercourse with the Devil or with demons. In the Anglo-Saxon Leechbook from the 10th century, there is a prescription for a salve against "women with whom the Devil has sexual intercourse," and in the 11th century, there appeared the idea that witches and heretics had sexual orgies during their meetings at night.

Beowulf

Damico (1984) connects , which she translates as 'demons' and 'sorceresses', to the word , which is glossed as Valkyrie, as a grim spirit of battle, and that it also appears in Beowulf as a name for Grendel, and for his mother by implication. She points out similarities between the haliurunas, the "fierce and hellish tribe", and Grendel and his mother. They were ravagers and raiders of the other tribes and they lived in the Maeotian Swamp, which was a "place of prohibition". In connection with this swamp, in the same account, there is an incident of a doe that is hesitant to enter the swamp, which appears to be a variation of the hart that is caught with its hooves on the border of Grendel's mere (1368- 1372).

Later influence
The story of the Halirunas appears to have become widely known in Europe. The Hungarian author Simon of Kéza, who considered the Huns to be the ancestors of the Hungarians, retold the story in 1282–1285, but he claimed not to believe in the account as it implied a taint in the ancestry of the Hungarians:

In about 1486, Johannes de Thurocz changed the account and made the women into sorceresses and the demons into demi-gods. He claimed to use a text by Antoninus of Florence as a source, and Antoninus was said to have used Vincent and Sigilbert as sources: 

At about the same time (between 1486 and 1489) Filippo Buonaccorsi also retold the story but called the women "consecrated women" and the demons "fauns and satyrs", with some claims of objectivity:

Notes

Sources

 
 
 

 
 
 
 
 
 
 
 
 
 
 
 
 
 
 
 
 

 

Germanic seeresses